Hoppstädten-Weiersbach Airfield is a general aviation airport in Hoppstädten-Weiersbach, Germany. It has two parallel runways in the 06/24 direction; one asphalt and one grass. Despite this, no left (L) or right (R) markings are used. During the cold war, it was known as Boehmer Army Airfield and was used by the US Army which had aircraft based there from 1956 until 1973 and used it as a maintenance facility thereafter. It was nicknamed Happy Valley. When the cold war came to an end the airport was handed over to the German government. It no longer has a military function today and the airfield is now operated by a flying club.

See also

 Transport in Germany
 List of airports in Germany

References

External links
US Army Germany - 3rd Armored Cavalry Regiment
Flugsportverein Hoppstädten-Weiersbach

Airports in Rhineland-Palatinate
Buildings and structures in Rhineland-Palatinate